(), is a hadith collection compiled by the Islamic scholar Hammam ibn Munabbih ( or ). It is sometimes quoted as one of the earliest surviving works of its kind.

Description
Reputedly the oldest surviving collection of hadith, it exists in various manuscript collections and printed versions are widely available. It was first discovered and published in the 20th century by Muhammad Hamidullah. This publication was a collation of two manuscript copies of Sahifa Hammam bin Munabbih, one found in a library in Damascus and the other in a library in Berlin. The collection contains approximately 140 ahadith all of which have an isnad (chain of narrators) The Prophet →  Abū Hurayrah → Hammām → Ma‘mar → ‘Abd al-Razzāq.

Hammam bin Munabbih was a disciple of Abu Hurairah from whom he relates the narrations comprising the sahifah, noting "this is what Abū Ḥurayra told us, on the authority of Muhammad the Messenger of God, peace and blessings be upon him". It was generally known that the Sahifah had been completely included in the Musnad Ahmad. 

The original manuscript for the text has been lost, but the text survives through secondary copies of it.

Contested Authorship
Although most muslim scholars and some western orientalist hadith scholars confirm its attribution to Ibn Munabbih, G.H.A. Juynboll argues that it was concocted by 'Abd ar-Razzaq.

Publications
Ṣaḥı̄fat Hammām ibn Munabbih. 1st ed., edited by Rifʿat Fawzı̄ ʿAbd al‐Muṭṭalib. Cairo: Maktabat al‐Khānjı̄. (1985) Sahifah Hammam ibn Munabbih : the earliest extant work on the Hadith'' Muhammad Hamidullah tr. Muhammad Rahimuddin, Centre culturel islamique (Paris, France); 1979

See also
 
List of Sunni books
Sahifah

References

8th-century Arabic books
Sunni literature
Sunni hadith collections